Neobradyidae is a family of crustaceans belonging to the order Harpacticoida.

Genera:
 Antarcticobradya Huys, 1987
 Marsteinia Drzycimski, 1968
 Neobradya Scott, 1892
 Tachidiopsis Sars, 1911

References

Harpacticoida